Fruits Basket was adapted into a twenty-six episode anime series by Studio Deen and premiered in Japan on TV Tokyo on July 5 with the final episode airing on December 27, 2001. Based on the twenty-three volume manga series written by Natsuki Takaya, the series tells the story of Tohru Honda, an orphan girl living in a tent so as not to trouble anyone. After meeting Yuki, Kyo, and Shigure Sohma (who later ask her to do their housework in exchange for a room to stay in), she learns thirteen members of the Sohma family are possessed by the animals of the Chinese zodiac legend and cursed to turn into their animal forms if they embrace anyone of the opposite sex or if their bodies are under great stress. The series was directed by Akitaro Daichi. During production of the series, Daichi and Takaya ran into multiple creative differences including the cast, coloring, and storytelling direction, leading Takaya to dislike the adaptation. Funimation aired the series, in dubbed English, on their anime television channel as well as on Colours TV.

Fruits Basket was released to DVD in nine individual volumes by King Records on a monthly schedule from September 29, 2001, through May 22, 2002, with a series box set released on April 25, 2007. The series is licensed for Region 1 and Region 2 release by Funimation, which released it as four individual DVD volumes containing 6-7 episodes and as a complete series box set. As part of their release, Funimation renamed all of the episodes, which originally had simple names of "First story", "Second story", etc. On November 20, 2007, Funimation re-released the series as part of their lower priced Viridian line, with the new release containing the complete series in a thin-packed box set. The Region 2 United Kingdom releases were done through a sub-licensing agreement with Revelation Films. The series was released in Region 4 by Madman Entertainment as a series box set.
The series uses three pieces of theme music, all performed by Ritsuko Okazaki.  is used for the opening theme for all twenty-six episodes.  is used for the series ending theme, except for episode twenty-five, which uses the song . In the English version, the theme songs were rewritten and redubbed with the English voice actresses Meredith McCoy performing the opening theme, Laura Bailey performing the 1st ending theme and Daphne Gere performing the 2nd ending theme.

Episode list

Home media

Region 1
In Region 1, the series was released on DVD by Funimation. Funimation released the series in four single disc volumes, with English and Japanese audio and English subtitles.  The first two volumes include six episodes, while the final two have seven. The series was released as a box set on November 16, 2004. In 2007, Funimation began re-releasing the individual volumes as part of their value priced Viridian Collection. Other than a slightly redesigned cover to include the Viridian Collection tag, the volumes are identical to the regular versions.  The series box set was also re-released as part of the Viridian Collection, in the form of a thin-pack set. A 16th anniversary Blu-ray boxset of the series was issued on August 1, 2017, containing a 24-page series guide art booklet and new extras.

Region 2 (Japan)
The series was originally released in Japan in nine individual DVD volumes by King Records, with each volume containing three episodes except for the first volume, which contained two. The first, sixth, eighth, and ninth volumes were also given limited edition releases.  The first and sixth limited edition volumes included a series box, while the eight included a set of six trading cards and a figurine. The final volume's limited edition version also included a figurine. A deluxe season box set was released on April 25, 2007. In addition to the complete series, the box set includes a message card from Natsuki Takaya, a 60-page deluxe booklet, and a bonus Fruits Basket CD soundtrack. All of the original volumes have Japanese language tracks with no subtitles.

Region 2 (Europe)
Through their deal with Funimation for subleasing titles, MVM Entertainment released the series to Region 2 DVD in Europe. The series was released as four individual volumes which are identical to those released by Funimation in Region 1. On November 14, 2006, Funimation announced that MVM would not longer be distributing their titles. Instead, all of their title distribution in the United Kingdom would be handled by Revelation Films. Revelation Films re-released the four individual volumes under their label and released the series box set on January 22, 2007.

However MVM have regained the licence and re-released the series as a four disc set on February 6, 2012, in the UK. MVM also released the Blu-ray Collector's Edition on February 19, 2018.

Region 4
Fruits Basket was released to Region 4 DVD by Madman Entertainment on October 15, 2003, in the form of a complete series box set.  The set uses the same box set used for the original Region 1 release of the complete series by Funimation. The on-disc extras in the set include character profiles, textless opening and closing sequences, a behind the scenes featurette, an interview with the director, and image galleries.

See also

 Fruits Basket (2019 TV series)

References

External links
 
 

Episodes
Fruits Basket